The 2012 Shanghai Challenger was a professional tennis tournament played on hard courts. It was the second edition of the tournament which was part of the 2012 ATP Challenger Tour. It took place in Shanghai, China between 3 and 9 September 2012.

Singles main-draw entrants

Seeds

 1 Rankings are as of August 27, 2012.

Other entrants
The following players received wildcards into the singles main draw:
  Chang Yu
  Li Zhe
  Ouyang Bowen
  Wang Chieh-fu

The following players received entry as a special exempt into the singles main draw:
  Gong Maoxin
  Christopher Rungkat

The following players received entry from the qualifying draw:
  Antony Dupuis
  Norbert Gomboš
  Sanam Singh
  Jose Statham

Champions

Singles

 Lu Yen-hsun def.  Peter Gojowczyk, 7–5, 6–0

Doubles

 Sanchai Ratiwatana /  Sonchat Ratiwatana def.  Yuki Bhambri /  Divij Sharan, 6–4, 6–4

External links

Shanghai Challenger
Shanghai Challenger
2012 in Chinese tennis